Monte Valletto is a mountain of Lombardy, Italy. It is located within the Bergamo Alps.

Mountains of the Alps
Mountains of Lombardy